SsangYong Group is a South Korean-based Enterprise Group or conglomerate founded in 1987. SsangYong, literally translated, means "Double Dragon". It was largely broken up by the Asian financial crisis in 1997. 

The chaebol was forced to sell or relinquish control in many of their subsidiary interests including the SsangYong Motor Company; the Ssangyong Paper Co., now controlled by Hankook P&G, Ssangyong Cement Industrial Co. Ltd, was owned by the shipping company, Afro-Asia; Yongpyung Resort, Ssangyong Heavy Industries, Ssangyong Precision Industry Co., Ssangyong Engineering & Construction Co., Ltd, and Riverside Cement, now controlled by Texas Industries, Inc. and Ssangyong Oil Refining Co., Sale of treasury stock in 1999.

See also
1997 Asian financial crisis
Economy of South Korea
List of South Korean companies
SsangYong Motor Company

References

Construction and civil engineering companies of South Korea